The following highways are numbered 563:

Canada
Alberta Highway 563
 Highway 563 (Ontario)

Ireland
 R563 regional road

United States